Alphaea hongfena is a moth of the family Erebidae. It was described by Cheng-Lai Fang in 1983. It is found in Yunnan, China.

References

Moths described in 1983
Spilosomina
Moths of Asia